Jeffrey Drebin is a surgeon and scientist. He serves as the Department of Surgery Chair at Memorial Sloan Kettering.

Biography 
Drebin earned his MD and PhD from Harvard Medical School, before completing his general surgery residency, and surgical oncology fellowship, at Johns Hopkins Medical School. His PhD research, performed with Mark Greene and Robert Weinberg, involved the creation of monoclonal antibodies targeting the Her2/neu protein and demonstrating in preclinical models that such antibodies could inhibit cancer cell growth in vitro and in vivo. This work was focused on targeted cancer therapy and the creation of the drugs trastuzumab (Herceptin) and pertuzumab (Perjeta).

Career 
In 1995, after finishing his residency, Drebin became an Assistant Professor of Surgery at Washington University School of Medicine. He became an Associate Professor in 1999, and then a full Professor of Surgery and of Molecular Biology & Pharmacology in 2002. Drebin began working at Penn Medicine in 2004, when he was hired as Chief of the Division of Gastrointestinal Surgery. In 2009, he was named Chair of the Department. While there, he joined a Stand Up to Cancer “Dream Team” against pancreatic cancer as a co-Principal Investigator alongside Craig B. Thompson. In 2017, Drebin moved to Memorial Sloan Kettering to become Department of Surgery Chair. In addition to his responsibilities as Chair, he provides surgical treatments for patients with pancreatic, gallbladder, bile duct, liver, and stomach cancers. His research focuses on the development of new targeted therapies.

Other roles 

 President, Society of Clinical Surgery (2010-2012)
 President, Philadelphia Academy of Surgery (2014)
 President, Society of Surgical Oncology (2015)

Awards 

 American Association for Cancer Research Surgeon Scientist Award (2016)
 Member, Institute of Medicine of the National Academy of Sciences (now the National Academy of Medicine) (2013)
 John Rhea Barton Professorship (2009-2017)

References

External links 
 https://www.mskcc.org/cancer-care/doctors/jeffrey-drebin

Cancer researchers
American surgeons
Memorial Sloan Kettering Cancer Center faculty
Year of birth missing (living people)
Living people
Washington University in St. Louis faculty
Harvard Medical School alumni
Memorial Sloan Kettering Cancer Center physicians
20th-century American physicians
20th-century surgeons
21st-century American physicians
21st-century surgeons
Members of the National Academy of Medicine